Thomas Green (June 8, 1814 – April 12, 1864) was an American soldier and lawyer, who took part in the Texan Revolution of 1835–36, serving under Sam Houston, who rewarded him with a land grant. Green was clerk of the Texas Supreme Court until the outbreak of the Civil War, when he became a Confederate cavalry leader. After winning several victories, including the Battle of Valverde and the recapture of Galveston, he was promoted brigadier and assigned command of the cavalry division of the Trans-Mississippi Department. In the Red River Campaign, he was mortally wounded while charging a fleet of Federal gunboats. The Union naval commander David Dixon Porter paid tribute to Green as a serious loss to the Confederacy.

Early life and career
Green was born in Buckingham County in Virginia to Nathan and Mary (Field) Green. The family moved to Tennessee in 1817. He attended Jackson College and Cumberland College (Princeton, Kentucky) before he received a degree from the University of Tennessee at Knoxville in 1834. He then studied law with his father, who was a judge on the Tennessee Supreme Court.

When the Texas Revolution began, Green left Tennessee to join the rebel volunteers. He arrived in Nacogdoches in December 1835, and enlisted in Isaac N. Moreland's company on January 14, 1836. During the April 21 Battle of San Jacinto, Green helped operate the famed "Twin Sisters" cannons, the only artillery present in Sam Houston's army. A few days after the decisive victory, Houston rewarded Green with a commission as a lieutenant. In early May, he was promoted to major and assigned as the aide-de-camp to General Thomas J. Rusk. With hostilities over, Green resigned on May 30 and returned to Tennessee to resume studying law.

In 1837, the legislature of the new Republic of Texas granted large tracts of land to leading veterans of the Revolution, including Green. After relocating to Fayette County, Green became a county surveyor at La Grange. That same year, fellow San Jacinto veteran William W. Gant nominated Green for the position of engrossing clerk for the Texas House of Representatives. He was subsequently elected and held the office until 1839 when he represented Fayette County in the House of Representatives in the Fourth Texas Congress. After a single term, he chose not to run again and resumed his clerkship. During the Sixth and Eighth Texas Congresses, he served as secretary of the Senate. From 1841 to 1861, he was clerk of the Texas Supreme Court, in both the republic and the subsequent U.S. state.

During his legislative career, Green continued his involvement with Texas's military.  He participated in John H. Moore's 1840 campaign against the Comanches up the Colorado River. When Mexican general Ráfael Vásquez briefly occupied San Antonio in March 1842, Green recruited the Travis County Volunteers and stood as their captain; the unit was not involved in combat. In response to this and two other Mexican incursions, Texas launched the punitive Somervell Expedition against Mexico; Green served as its inspector general. In the Mexican–American War, Green recruited a company of Texas Rangers from LaGrange and served as their captain during the 1846 U.S. capture of Monterrey in the state of Nuevo León.

Green married Mary Wallace Chalmers, daughter of the editor and politician John Gordon Chalmers, in 1847.  The couple eventually had six children.

Tom Green County, Texas, was named in his honor.

Civil War
After Texas seceded in early 1861, Green was elected colonel of the 5th Texas Cavalry Regiment, which, as part of a brigade led by Brig. Gen. Henry H. Sibley, joined the invasion of New Mexico Territory in 1862. There, Green led the Confederate victory at the Battle of Valverde in February. After a difficult retreat into Texas, he led his men, aboard the river steamer Bayou City, to assist in the recapture of Galveston on January 1, 1863. He was also involved in the seizure of the Union steamer Harriet Lane that same day.

Bayou Teche Campaign
In the spring of 1863, Green commanded the First Cavalry Brigade in Richard Taylor's division in the fighting along Bayou Teche in Louisiana. He was promoted to brigadier general, May 20, 1863. In June, he captured a Union garrison at Brashear City, but failed to seize Fort Butler on the Mississippi River. Green's cavalry routed advancing Union troops under Godfrey Weitzel and Cuvier Grover at Koch's (Cox's) Plantation on July 13. In September, the First Cavalry Brigade captured another Union detachment at Stirling's Plantation. A similar success followed in November at the Battle of Bayou Bourbeux. In four victories, Green's men inflicted about 3,000 casualties and suffered only 600 losses. Green was subsequently assigned command of the cavalry division of the Trans-Mississippi Department.

Red River Campaign
During the Red River Campaign, Green led his division of cavalry from Texas to reinforce Taylor in Louisiana to stop the advance of Maj. Gen. Nathaniel P. Banks toward Shreveport.  Green participated in the Battle of Mansfield and the Battle of Pleasant Hill. A few days later, on April 12, 1864, Green was mortally wounded by a shell from a Federal gunboat while leading an attack on the gunboats patrolling the Red River at Blair’s Landing. He soon died on Blair's Plantation. Upon his death, Union Admiral David Dixon Porter paid tribute to the fallen Confederate cavalryman in saying that Green was "one in whom the rebels place more confidence than anyone else. He led his men to the very edge of the bank, they shouting and yelling like madmen—losing General Green had paralyzed them; he was worth 5,000 men to them." He is buried in the family plot at Oakwood Cemetery in Austin, Texas.

Historian John D. Winters in The Civil War in Louisiana (1963) quotes a Texas soldier who fought under Green: "He was a man who, when out of whiskey, was a mild mannered gentleman, but when in good supply of old burst-head was all fight." Winters continues: "Well fortified with Louisiana rum, Green with a yell told [his men] that he was going to show them how to fight. The charge against the gunboats was made on horseback. Green was killed well in advance, a cannon shot taking off the top of his head. ... Drunk or sober, foolish or not in waging the attack, Green was a valuable man, and General Taylor lamented him."

Memorials
 Tom Green Street in Brenham, Texas is named for Green
 Tom Green County, Texas (1875) is named for Green
 USS Tom Green County (1953–1972) was indirectly named for Green.

See also

 List of American Civil War generals (Confederate)

References

Further reading
 Eicher, John H., and David J. Eicher, Civil War High Commands. Stanford: Stanford University Press, 2001. .
 United States War Department, The Military Secretary's Office, Memorandum relative to the general officers appointed by the President in the armies of the Confederate States--1861-1865 (1908) (Compiled from official records) Caption shows 1905 but printing date is February 11, 1908. Retrieved August 5, 2010.

External links
 

American military personnel of the Mexican–American War
Confederate States Army brigadier generals
1814 births
1864 deaths
Confederate States of America military personnel killed in the American Civil War
Burials at Oakwood Cemetery (Austin, Texas)
Republic of Texas politicians
1st Congress of the Republic of Texas
People from Amelia County, Virginia
People from Buckingham County, Virginia
People of Texas in the American Civil War
University of Tennessee alumni
Tom Green County, Texas